Sékouba Camara (born 10 August 1983) is a Guinean former professional footballer who played as a midfielder. He made three appearances for the Guinea national team from 2005 to 2006.

International career
Camara was a member of the Guinea squad for the 2006 African Nations Cup where the team were eliminated in the quarter-finals.

External links

1983 births
Living people
Guinean footballers
Guinea international footballers
AS Kaloum Star players
Association football defenders